Not Obtain+1 is the first full-length album from Japanese rock band 12012 along with Play Dolls. The album was simultaneously released with Play Dolls. Not Obtain+1 features many of the singles and distributed CDs released prior to February, 2006.

Track listing 
"Incur..." – 5:05
"Shounen to Orchestra" (少年とオーケストラ) – 4:41
"Suisou no Naka no Kanojo" (水槽の中の彼女) – 4:34
"Newspaper" – 4:49
"Ray ~Hidari Mawari no Kaichuudokei~ (Ray ~左回りの懐中時計~) – 5:22
"Vomit" – 3:30
"Swallow" – 4:37
"Sick" – 4:45
"Knife" (ナイフ) – 4:13
"Shower" – 5:07

12012 albums
2006 albums